West Bradford Township is a township in Chester County, Pennsylvania, United States. The population was 12,376 at the 2010 census.

History
There are three federal historic districts (Marshallton, Trimbleville, and Northbrook) on the National Register of Historic Places located within West Bradford Township.  Also listed are the Baily Farm, Bradford Friends Meetinghouse, Como Farm, Derbydown Homestead, Humphry Marshall House, Marshallton Inn, and Temple-Webster-Stoner House.

Geography
According to the United States Census Bureau, the township has a total area of 18.6 square miles (48.2 km), of which, 18.6 square miles (48.1 km) is land and 0.1 square miles (0.2 km) is water.  The total area is 0.32% water.

Adjacent municipalities
Caln Township (north)
Downingtown (north)
East Caln Township (north)
East Bradford Township (east)
Newlin Township (south)
Pocopson Township (south)
East Fallowfield Township (west)

Neighborhoods
Brandywine Greene
Embreeville
Marshallton
Northbrook
 Romansville
Trimbleville
Victoria Crossing at Bradford Glen

Demographics

As of the census of 2010, there were 12,376 people, 4,126 households, and 3,449 families residing in the township.  The population density was 665.4 people per square mile (256.9/km).  There were 4,217 housing units at an average density of 226.7/sq mi (87.5/km).  The racial makeup of the township was 92.4% White, 2.9% African American, 0.2% Native American, 2.6% Asian, 0.00% Pacific Islander, 0.5% from other races, and 1.4% from two or more races.  2.0% of the population were Hispanic or Latino of any race.

There were 4,126 households, out of which 42.0% had children under the age of 18 living with them, 74.6% were married couples living together, 6.1% had a female householder with no husband present, and 16.4% were non-families. 13.0% of all households were made up of individuals, and 4.4% had someone living alone who was 65 years of age or older.  The average household size was 2.96 and the average family size was 3.25.

In the township the population was spread out, with 30.4% under the age of 19, 4.0% from 20 to 24, 24.8% from 25 to 44, 31.7% from 45 to 64, and 9.2% who were 65 years of age or older.  The median age was 39.6 years. For every 100 females, there were 100.1 males.  For every 100 females age 18 and over, there were 97.7 males.

The median income for a family was $104,124.

Education

Public schools
West Bradford Township is served by the Downingtown Area School District, and has two elementary schools within the township:

Bradford Heights Elementary School
West Bradford Elementary School

Each of the two elementary schools serves sections of the township. All of the township is zoned to Downingtown Middle School and Downingtown West High School.

Transportation

U.S. Route 322 and Pennsylvania Route 162 are the numbered roads serving West Bradford Township. US 322 follows the Downingtown Pike along a northwest-southeast alignment across the northeastern portion of the township. PA 162 follows Telegraph Road and Strasburg Road along a southwest-northeast alignment across the southeastern portion of the township.

Notable places
The west branch of the Brandywine River passes through West Bradford. General Cornwallis of the British Army crossed the river at Trimble's Ford en route to the Battle of Brandywine.
Broad Run Golfer's Club, a golf course designed by Rees Jones
Humphry Marshall House, residence of botanist Humphry Marshall located in the village of Marshallton
Strasburg Road, a historic road paved in 1772-3 that runs through West Bradford
United Sports, a multiple-use sports complex

Notable residents
Planter and judge John Beale Bordley resided at and owned Como Farm in West Bradford. The clubhouse of Broad Run Golfer's Club now sits on the ground that was formerly Como Farm.
Former United States congressman John Hickman was born in West Bradford.
The well known botanist Humphry Marshall lived in West Bradford.
The actor Claude Rains, who earned four Oscar Nominations for supporting actor and portrayed Captain Renault in the film Casablanca, owned the Stock Grange Farm in West Bradford. The farm had previously been in the family of the Philadelphia naturalist Witmer Stone, who spent summers at Stock Grange while growing up.

References

External links

West Bradford official website

Townships in Chester County, Pennsylvania
Townships in Pennsylvania